The 2013 STP 300 was the 18th stock car race of the 2013 NASCAR Nationwide Series and the 24th iteration of the event. The race was held on Sunday, July 21, 2013, in Joliet, Illinois, at Chicagoland Speedway, a 1.5 miles (2.41 km) tri-oval speedway. The race took the scheduled 200 laps to complete. At race's end, Joey Logano, driving for Penske Racing, would be able to take away the lead from teammate and eventual-second-place finisher Sam Hornish Jr. to win his 20th career NASCAR Nationwide Series win and his second of the season. To fill out the podium, Austin Dillon of Richard Childress Racing finished third.

Background 

Chicagoland Speedway is a 1.5 miles (2.41 km) tri-oval speedway in Joliet, Illinois, southwest of Chicago. The speedway opened in 2001 and currently hosts NASCAR racing. Until 2011, the speedway also hosted the IndyCar Series, recording numerous close finishes including the closest finish in IndyCar history. The speedway is owned and operated by International Speedway Corporation and located adjacent to Route 66 Raceway.

Entry list 

 (R) denotes rookie driver.
 (i) denotes driver who is ineligible for series driver points.

Practice

First practice 
The first practice session was held on Saturday, July 20, at 11:30 AM CST, and would last for two hours and 30 minutes.

Second practice 
The second and final practice session, sometimes referred to as Happy Hour, was held on Saturday, July 20, at 2:30 PM EST, and would last for one hour and 30 minutes.

Qualifying 
Qualifying was held on Sunday, July 21, at 10:05 AM CST. Each driver would have two laps to set a fastest time; the fastest of the two would count as their official qualifying lap.

Tim Schendel was the only driver to fail to qualify.

Full qualifying results

Race results

References 

2013 NASCAR Nationwide Series
NASCAR races at Chicagoland Speedway
July 2013 sports events in the United States
2013 in sports in Illinois